The men's 200 metre backstroke competition of the swimming events at the 1975 Pan American Games took place on 21 October. The last Pan American Games champion was Charlie Campbell of the United States.

This race consisted of four lengths of the pool, all in backstroke.

Results
All times are in minutes and seconds.

Heats

Final 
The final was held on October 21.

References

Swimming at the 1975 Pan American Games